Mashare is a constituency in the Kavango East region of northern Namibia. The district centre is the settlement of Mashare. It had a population of 15,688 in 2011, down from 16,007 in 2001.  the constituency had 9,165 registered voters.

The constituency contains the settlements of Dwasa, Tceha, Kondja, Namagadi, and Rudjadja.

There is a bilateral agreement with Angola to allow mutual near-border immigration without travel documents. This applies to a maximum distance of 30 km, it is not valid for tourists.

Politics
The 2015 regional elections were won by SWAPO candidate Mavara Fillipus Nkore with 2,707 votes. Paulus Sikongo of 
the All People's Party (APP) came second with 1,487 votes, and Nankema Shirongo of the Democratic Turnhalle Alliance (DTA) came third with 110 votes. Nkore was re-elected in the 2020 regional election after obtaining 1,716 votes. Engelbert Hamutenya Namufinda (APP) came second with 692 votes.

See also
 Constituencies of Namibia

References 

Constituencies of Kavango East Region
States and territories established in 1992
1992 establishments in Namibia